The 2021–22 IUPUI Jaguars women's basketball team represented Indiana University–Purdue University Indianapolis in the 2021–22 NCAA Division I women's basketball season. The Jaguars, led by twelfth-year head coach Austin Parkinson, played their home games at the IUPUI Gymnasium in Indianapolis, Indiana as members of the Horizon League.

They finished the season 24–5 overall and 18–2 in Horizon League play, to finish as co-champions of the regular season.  As the first seed in the Horizon League Tournament, they earned a bye into the Quarterfinals where they defeated Robert Morris.  They then went on to defeat Oakland in the Semifinals and Cleveland State in the Final to win the championship.  As a result, the Jaguars received the conference's automatic bid to the NCAA tournament where they were the thirteenth seed in the Bridgeport Region.  This was the first time the team appeared in the NCAA Tournament.  They received a bid in 2020, but the tournament was canceled due to the COVID-19 pandemic.  They lost in the first round to Oklahoma to end their season.

Previous season
The Jaguars finished the 2020–21 season 15–5, 11–3 in Horizon League play to finish in fifth place. As the fifth seed in the Horizon League Tournament, they received a bye in to the Quarterfinals where they defeated Oakland.  They then defeated Milwaukee in the Semifinals, but fell in the championship to Wright State.  They were not invited to the NCAA tournament or the WNIT.

Roster

Schedule and results

Source:

|-
!colspan=6 style=| Exhibition

|-
!colspan=6 style=| Regular season

|-
!colspan=6 style=| Horizon League Tournament

|-
!colspan=6 style=| NCAA tournament

|-

Rankings

The Coaches Poll did not release a Week 2 poll and the AP Poll did not release a poll after the NCAA Tournament.

References

IUPUI Jaguars women's basketball seasons
IUPUI Jaguars
IUPUI Jaguars women's basketball
IUPUI Jaguars women's basketball
IUPUI